Brisbane County was one of the original Nineteen Counties in New South Wales and is now one of the 141 Cadastral divisions of New South Wales. It includes Scone, Merriwa and Murrurundi. The Goulburn River is the boundary to the south and the Hunter River the boundary to the south-east. The Liverpool Range area is the boundary to the north, and the Krui River the boundary to the west.

Brisbane County was named in honour of Sir Thomas Makdougall Brisbane Governor (1773-1860). The Electoral district of Phillip, Brisbane and Bligh was the first electoral district for the area, between 1856 and 1859.

Parishes within this county 
A full list of parishes found within this county; their current LGA and mapping coordinates to the approximate centre of each location is as follows:

References

Counties of New South Wales